The Western Command (abbrv. as WESCOM) is the Armed Forces of the Philippines' unified command in charge of the islands of Palawan and Kalayaan, including the disputed Spratly Islands group. It is responsible for the defense of these areas against external aggresion, as well as combating terrorism and insurgency.

Operations
 Anti-guerrilla operations against the New People's Army
 Anti-terrorist operations against known terror groups operating in their AOR.
 Guarding and patrol operation on Philippine occupied Spratly Islands (Kalayaan Island Group).
Defense and Protection of Palawan and islands in the West Philippine Sea against Chinese Aggression.
 Joint Multinational Search and Rescue Operations for Malaysia Airlines Flight 370.

Organization
The following are the units that are under the Western Command:
 Tactical Operations Wing West, PAF
 Naval Forces West, PN
 MBLT-3, PMC
 MBLT-4, PMC
 18th Special Forces Company (Riverine), PA
 3rd Marine Brigade, PMC

References

External links
 
 Official History of the AFP citing the creation of Central Command

Regional commands of the Philippines
Military units and formations established in 2001
Puerto Princesa